Rina Choudhury is a former Indian actress who worked in Tollywood cinema and now working as a film director and writer.

Her first film was Geetsangeet. She directed Kalpataroo. She also appeared in the Bengali serial Erao Sotru in Zee Bangla.

Filmography
 Kyablar Biye (2013)
 Bolidaan (2010)
 Didibhai (2010)
 Mejobabu (2009)
 Santan (1999)
 Sriman Bhootnath (1997)
 Boro Bou (1997)
 Lofar (1997)
 Puja (1996)
 Mejo Bou (1995)
 Geet Sangeet (1994)
 Abbajan (1994)
 Maya Mamata (1993)
 Sotru

References

External links
 

Indian film actresses
Actresses from Kolkata
Actresses in Bengali cinema
21st-century Indian actresses
Living people
Year of birth missing (living people)